The 1989–90 IHL season was the 45th season of the International Hockey League, a North American minor professional league. Nine teams participated in the regular season, and the Indianapolis Ice won the Turner Cup.

Regular season

Turner Cup-Playoffs

External links
 Season 1989/90 on hockeydb.com 

IHL
IHL
International Hockey League (1945–2001) seasons